John Wood (born 14 July 1946) is an Australian television Gold Logie Award-winning actor and scriptwriter. 

Wood has appeared in numerous theatre and TV productions, but is best known for his roles in the legal drama Rafferty's Rules as Stipendiary Magistrate Michael Rafferty and in the long-running police drama Blue Heelers, as Tom Croydon both for the Seven Network.

Biography

Early career

Wood began his acting career in 1966, attending National Institute of Dramatic Art (NIDA) and doing a play called Eh? directed by Max Gillies and co-starring Tony Taylor. In 1970 he became a professional actor and worked for the Old Tote Theatre Company in a production of Death of a Salesman.

Career-Television

His first professional TV role was in Minus Five with Ken James and Rowena Wallace which went to air with the title Barrier Reef.
 
A common misconception is that his first role was a guest role in Bellbird, an Australian television series. He then appeared in several Australian drama series and mini-series in minor roles. He played the co-lead role of Stokey in the ABC drama series The Truckies in 1978, writing an episode. John also wrote eleven episodes of the series Prisoner, and several episodes of Cop Shop. It wasn't until 1987 that John Wood became a well-known actor, taking the lead in Rafferty's Rules, as magistrate Michael Rafferty. Wood twice won a Logie for "Most Outstanding Actor" for his role in the show during its four seasons.

In 1993 Wood landed a leading role in Blue Heelers as Tom Croydon. This show became a big hit in Australia. As well as starring in the show, he also wrote several episodes. The show was cancelled in 2006, and Wood is one of only two actors (the other being Julie Nihill) to star in Blue Heelers from its beginning in 1993 to its end in 2006, although Wood's character is the only one to be seen in every single episode. Wood also wrote three episodes for the series.

In 2005 he hosted the mini-documentary series Made in Melbourne about 50 years of HSV7

Wood was a contestant in the 2004 edition of the Australian Dancing with the Stars. In 2007, Wood appeared on Channel Ten's tele-movie, Joanne Lees: Murder in the Outback, where he played barrister Grant Algie. He currently hosts Channel Nine's travel series Wine Me, Dine Me.

In 2009, Wood appeared in the drama The Cut on ABC1, in the historical dramatised documentary Rogue Nation, also on ABC1, and in Channel Nine's drama-series Underbelly: A Tale of Two Cities playing Murray Farquhar.

In 2010, Wood had a recurring role in Offspring. In June 2011, it was announced that Wood had joined the cast of Neighbours for a six-month guest role as Martin Chambers. He made his first on screen appearance in September.

In 2012, he appeared in Miss Fisher's Murder Mysteries, and had a recurring role in The Doctor Blake Mysteries. In 2013, Wood had a guest role on It's a Date (TV series).

Memoirs

In August 2020 his memoir, How I Clawed My Way Back to the Middle, was published by Viking.

Notable television roles
The Challenge (1986) as Alan Bond
 Rafferty's Rules (1987–1990) as Michael Rafferty
 Blue Heelers (1993–2006) as Tom Croydon
 Dancing with the Stars (2004) as contestant
 The Einstein Factor (2006–2009) as brains trust (panelist)
 Joanne Lees: Murder in the Outback (2007) as Grant Algie
 The Cut (2009) as Bill Telford
 Underbelly: A Tale of Two Cities (2009) as Murray Farquhar
 Rogue Nation (2009) as Governor Bligh
 Offspring (2010) as Gareth
 Neighbours (2011–2012) as Dr. Martin Chambers
 The Doctor Blake Mysteries (2013-2017) as Patrick Tyneman

Notable movie roles
 The Office Picnic (1972) as Clyde
 The Taming of the Shrew (1973 film) (1973) as Hortensio
 Blue Fire Lady (1977) as Gus
 No Room for the Innocent (1977)
 Burn the Butterflies (1979)
 Ginger Meggs (1982) as Constable Brady
 The Empty Beach (1985) as Parker
 Displaced Persons (film) (1985) as Dr. Thomas 
 Twelfth Night (1986 film) (1986) as Sir Toby Belch
 The Bit Part (1987) as John Bainbridge
 Bullseye (1987 film) (1987) as Bluey McGurk
 Remembering Nigel (2009) as John Wood
 Backyard Ashes (2013) as Merv
 Beat (2022) as Dr. Mordon

Theatre

Wood is also an experienced stage actor. Notable roles include The Club, How to Succeed in Business Without Really Trying, ART, Born Yesterday, The Elocution of Benjamin Franklin, Cats (the musical),Chess , Love Letters, Blood Relations, The Real Inspector Hound’’, Strange Bedfellow The Musical and Stephen Sewell's It Just Stopped (2006).
 He played the Bishop of Basingstoke in the 25th anniversary concert of Jekyll & Hyde.

Awards

John Wood has won several TV Week Logie Awards over the years and has also been nominated for several.

In 1988 and 1989, Wood received the TV Week Logie Award for 'Most Outstanding Actor' for his work on Rafferty's Rules.John Wood–1989 Logie Awards   In 2006, he was nominated in the same category for his role in Blue Heelers.

Wood was nominated for the Gold Logie for Most Popular Personality on Australian Television every year from 1997 to 2007, for his role in Blue Heelers''. After nine consecutive Gold Logie nominations without a win, he was awarded the prize in 2006.

Wood has won the Most Popular Actor award twice (in 2005 and 2006) and has been nominated another eight consecutive times (1996–2003) for his role in Blue Heelers.

References

External links

 John Wood–Australian Broadcasting Corporation

1946 births
Australian male film actors
Australian male soap opera actors
Australian male stage actors
Gold Logie winners
National Institute of Dramatic Art alumni
Male actors from Melbourne
Living people
20th-century Australian male actors
21st-century Australian male actors